Mikhail Dangiriev (ru)
 Yuri Danilin (ru)
 Aleksandr Darkovich (ru)
 Ilyas Daudi
 Zakir Daudov (ru)
 Magomed Daudov
 Sultan Dautmerzaev (ru)
 Aleksandr Dvornikov
 Vladimir Dezhurov
 Pyotr Deynekin
 Yuri Deyneko (ru)
 Alibek Delimkhanov
 Aleksey Dergunov (ru)
 Nikolai Dzhardzhadze (ru)
 Zaur Dzhibilov (ru)
 Aleksandr Dzyuba (ru)
 Nikolai Dioritsa (ru)
 Yuri Dmitriev (ru)
 Aleksey Dmitrov (ru)
 Andrey Dneprovsky (ru)
 Oleg Dolgov (ru)
 Vladislav Dolonin (ru)
 Denis Dolonsky (ru)
 Anatoly Dorofeev (ru)
 Dmitry Dorofeev (ru)
 Fyodor Dorofeev (ru)
 Aleksandr Dostavalov (ru)
 Vladimir Dronov (ru)
 Viktor Dubovoy (ru)
 Viktor Dubynin
 Viktor Dudkin (ru)
 Oleg Dukanov (ru)
 Aleksandr Dumchikov (ru)
 Vladislav Dukhin (ru)
 Andrey Dyachenko (ru)
 Yuri Dyudya (ru)
 Aleksey Dyumin

References 
 

Heroes D